Orbanomics is the name given to the economic policies of Hungarian prime minister Viktor Orbán and his government since it took power in 2010. These policies are in reaction to the global economic crisis and the state of Hungary's economy in it. Instrumental in the invention and implementation of these policies was György Matolcsy, former Minister of National Economy and current Governor of the Hungarian National Bank.

History

After the 2010 parliamentary elections in Hungary, the newly elected Orbán government tried to negotiate an exemption from the strict European Union regulation setting a 3% limit on budget deficit. Since the request was declined, Hungary turned to taxation policies regarded as unorthodox by the international community to cover the deficit.

Policies and regulations

Approved reforms

Nationalisation of private pension funds 
All private pension funds were abolished and nationalised which are estimated around $12,000,000,000 in total.

Taxation
 Increased main VAT from 25% to 27% in 2012, while it decreased for certain products (meat, fish, chicken, eggs, internet, etc.) to 5% gradually from 2016-18;
 Decreased all corporate profit taxes from 10-19% to 9% regardless of revenue (previously, there was a non-flat corporate profit tax);
 Decreased payroll taxes paid on employee salaries by few percentages;
 Introduced new taxes on banks (transactions, withdrawals, etc).

Base interest rate
Decreased base interest rate gradually from 5.25% to 0.9% until May 2016.

Foreign currency denominated mortgages
 “(The FX mortgage conversion) was one of many negative and controversial decisions from Budapest and many people still find their decision-making controversial. But you have to acknowledge that so far it has worked,” said Marcus Svedberg, chief economist at asset manager East Capital.

Utility price cuts

Unemployment decrease

Unapproved reforms

Internet tax reform
As part of its economical reforms, Fidesz started to draft the new version of the Tax Law for 2015. Minister of National Economy Mihály Varga announced the proposal on October 21. According to the draft, Internet traffic would be taxed with a 150 Ft/GB rate irrespective of the type of data transmitted. This resulted in 2014 Hungarian Internet tax protests and government dropped the idea of introducing this new tax.

Family policies
The Orbán government has implemented several policies intended to raise the birth rate and reduce the number of abortions and divorces.

In 2010 Hungary's birth rate 1.25 children per woman in 2010 when Orbán first regain office, but by 2019 one year into his third term since his reelection it increased to 1.49 children per woman according to the World Bank.

Orbán has claimed in the 2019 Hungarian State of the Nation speech that his family policies are a replacement for replacing a declining nation's population without immigration.

Criticism 
György Molnár, a workfare specialist at the Institute for Economics at the Hungarian Academy of Science, has argued the actual unemployment rate in Hungary was 7.3% instead of 4.2% in 2018, as close to 4% of the workforce participated in Hungary's workfare program where they actually barely work often for 1 or 2 hours a day and are paid $175 a month which is less than half of the minimum wage in Hungary. The New York Times also pointed to other issues such as increased corruption in Hungary, declining health care quality, and declining student achievement in reading, math and science as issues facing Hungary under Orbanomics. Factors outside of Hungary's control have also been used to explain part of the country's economic revival, such as EU funding constituting 4% of the country's GDP and global economic improvement.

See also
 Abenomics
 Reaganomics

References

General references

 
 

2010s economic history
Eponymous economic ideologies
Economic history of Hungary
Viktor Orbán